Plectroglyphidodon flaviventris is a species of Perciformes in the family Pomacentridae.

References 

flaviventris
Animals described in 1974